The Groupe Atlantic is a French HVAC company. It was founded in la Roche-sur-Yon (in Vendée region on the west coast of France) by Mr Radat and Mr Lamoure in 1968. Groupe Atlantic is based in 10 different countries with over 20 factories.
The company has 20 factories, 10 of which are located outside France, and approximately 6,500 employees (as of March 2017), of which approximately 2,900 are outside France

Its mission is:
"To transform prevailing energies into lasting well-being, by creating thermal comfort solutions that are ecologically efficient, accessible to all and suited to individual needs."
Groupe Atlantic also own Ideal Boilers located in Hull, UK.

History
1968 - Atlantic was founded by Paul Radat and Pierre Lamoure.

1973 - Guillot was acquired

1986 - Thermor & Sauter were acquired

1989 - Pacific was acquired

1993 - Elge was acquired

2000 - Ygnis (Switzerland) was acquired (the first acquisition outside France)

2002 - Franco-Belge was acquired

2004 - The Cairo (Egypt) site was created

2006 - Magnum was acquired

2006 - The Odessa (Ukraine) site was created

2007 - The Izmir (Turkey) site was created

2008 - Hamworthy (United Kingdom) was taken over

2008 - The Fontaine (France) site was created

2011 - Lazzarini (Italy) and Erensan (Turkey) were acquired

2013 - Feinwerk (Germany) and Austria Email (Austria) were acquired

2014 - The Rayong (Thailand) site was created

2015 - Ideal, Keston and Gledhill (United Kingdom) were acquired

2015 – The Billy-Berclau (France) site was created

2016 - The Trappes (France) site was created

2017 - Thercon (Belgium) and Orcon (Netherlands) were acquired

2017 - The Kutasi (Georgia) site was created

2017 - The Dehradun (India) site was created

2018 - The Izmir (Turkey) site was created

2019 - ACV (Belgium) was acquired

Acquisitions

Industrial sites
EUROPE🇪🇺

FRANCE 🇫🇷
 Orleans -> Electric radiators
 Fontaine -> Electric, solar and heat pump water heaters
 St Louis -> Electric water heaters
 Billy-Berclau -> Domestic boilers, heat pumps, hybrid solutions
 Cauroir -> Commercial boilers and cylinders
 Merville -> Domestic boilers, heat pumps, hybrid solutions
 Aulnay-sous-bois -> Boiler Room Equipment
 Meyzieu -> Air conditioning, ventilation and fire protection
 Pont-de-Vaux -> Commercial boilers
 La Roche-sur-Yon -> Electric radiators, Bathroom radiators, electric and heat pump water heaters, Electronic control
AUSTRIA 🇦🇹
 Knittlefeld -> Sanitary hot water
EGYPT 🇪🇬
 Cairo -> Electric water heaters, Towels Drier
 Cairo (JV) -> Thermostats, heat rods
UKRAINE 🇺🇦
 Odessa -> Electric water heaters, electric convector heaters
UK 🇬🇧
 Hull -> Domestic and Commercial boilers
 Blackpool -> Stainless Steel and Copper water heaters
 Poole -> Commercial boilers and Sanitary hot water

ASIA

THAILAND 🇹🇭
 Rayong (JV) - Electric water heaters and heat pump systems

TURKEY 🇹🇷
 Izmir -> Bathroom radiators
 Yozgat (shareholding) -> Commercial boilers

Commercial sites
EUROPE🇪🇺

FRANCE 🇫🇷
 Bourg-la-reine
 La Roche-sur-Yon
 Meyzieu
 Orléans
 Toussieu

AUSTRIA 🇦🇹
 Knittelfeld

BELGIUM 🇧🇪
 Waterloo

CZECH REPUBLIC 🇨🇿
 Prague

GERMANY 🇩🇪
 Geldersheim
 Weiden i.d. OPf.

ITALY 🇮🇹
 Castronno, Varese
 Conegliano (JV)
 Faenza

NETHERLANDS 🇳🇱
 Veenendaal (JV)

POLAND 🇵🇱
 Warsaw
 Wloclawek

PORTUGAL 🇵🇹
 Lisbon

RUSSIA 🇷🇺
 Moscow

SPAIN 🇪🇸
 Castelldefels, Barcelona
 Mataró, Barcelona

SWITZERLAND 🇨🇭
 Ruswil
 Hergiswil (JV)

UKRAINE 🇺🇦
 Kharkov (JV)

UNITED KINGDOM 🇬🇧
 Blackpool
 Hull
 Poole
 Fife

ASIA

TURKEY 🇹🇷
 Istanbul

UNITED ARAB EMIRATES 🇦🇪
 Dubai

VIETNAM 🇻🇳
 Ho Chi Minh City

AFRICA 

EGYPT 🇪🇬
 Cairo

References

External links 
 

Multinational companies headquartered in France
Manufacturing companies established in 1968
Vendée
French companies established in 1968